Philip Lewis Clarke (September 8, 1938 – April 23, 2013) was an American voice actor.

He provided voices in several TV series, films, and video games, including his leading role as Malcolm Betruger in Doom 3.

Roles

 Oliver Twist - Additional Voices
 Devlin - Additional Voices
 Scooby-Doo and Scrappy-Doo
 Cataclysm - Additional Voices
 The Man Who Saw Tomorrow - Nostradamus
 The Smurfs - Additional Voices
 Spider-Man - Sidewinder/Wild Willie Wilson
 Meatballs and Spaghetti - Additional Voices
 The New Scooby-Doo and Scrappy-Doo Show - Additional Voices
 The Dukes - Additional Voices
 Challenge of the GoBots - Dr. Go, Tork
 Pole Position - Additional Voices
 CBS Storybreak - Additional Voices
 Starchaser: The Legend of Orin - Additional Voices
 GoBots: Battle of the Rock Lords - Herr Fiend, Crackpot, Tork
 The Transformers - Dead End, Tantrum, Auggie Cahnay, Abdul Fakkadi, Victor Drath, Marty Minkler, Ozu's sensei, Zeta Prime
 G.I. Joe - Matthew Burke
 Wildfire - Lord Sampson
 The Chipmunk Adventure - Additional Voices
 DuckTales - Additional Voices
 The Chipmunks - Additional Voices
 Popeye and Son - Additional Voices
 Inhumanoids - Harry Slattery/Dirty Beggar Sorcerer
 The Super Mario Bros. Super Show! - Computer
 The Little Mermaid - Sailor #3
 The Rescuers Down Under - Mouse at Rescue Aid Society, Mice at the Restaurant
 Beauty and the Beast - Male Villager
 An American Tail: Fievel Goes West - Male Mice
 Aladdin - Guards
 The Pirates of Dark Water - Additional Voices
 Cyberia - Additional Voices
 The Lion King - Hyenas
 The Pebble and the Penguin - King
 Skeleton Warriors - Baron Dark
 Adventures in Odyssey - Additional Voices
 The Hunchback of Notre Dame - Frollo's Soldiers
 The Fantastic Voyages of Sinbad the Sailor - Additional Voices
 Quest for Camelot - Ruber's Minions

Video games

References

External links
 

2013 deaths
American male voice actors
American male video game actors
20th-century American male actors
21st-century American male actors